Kangra colony is a township in union council Panian of Haripur district in Khyber Pakhtunkhwa province of Pakistan.

Demographics

Hindko language is the main language in this area that have 98% speakers in Kangra colony. Otherwise Pashtu and Urdu rarely spoken.

Many tribes are settled in Kangra colony e.g. Tanolis, Dhund Abbasi, Awans, etc.

References 

Haripur District